Birdy is the debut studio album by English musician Birdy, released on 4 November 2011 by 14th Floor Records and Atlantic Records. The album includes the singles "Skinny Love", "Shelter", "People Help the People" and "1901".

Critical reception 

Birdy received lukewarm reception from critics. At Metacritic, the album received a score of 61 out of 100, based on 10 critics. AllMusic's Jon O'Brien wrote that "this stripped-back collection of lesser-known hits and album tracks reads like a who's who of lo-fi hipster indie rock", praising Birdy's "youthful and fragile" voice and concluding that "thanks to her haunting tones and a tasteful yet compelling production, it impressively avoids being the try-hard affair you'd expect." The BBC's Nick Levine called the album a "clever covers set... which points to a great future" for the singer. "With a voice that defies her tender years, Birdy... has found herself very quickly touted as one of the brightest up-and-coming talents in the UK," Andy Baber of MusicOMH wrote. Hermione Hoby of The Observer praised her covers of "Skinny Love" and "Shelter", while noting that the self-written track "Without a Word" "suggests she might become even more than just a startling voice."

While praising "Birdy's simple piano/guitar arrangements and her own sweet voice", The Guardians Caroline Sullivan found the album to be "pleasant but pointless". James Lachno of The Daily Telegraph wrote that the album "consolidates the buzz with more sparse, affecting covers, and a lone original track that is adequately folkish, but for now Birdy remains a novelty." Chris Conaton of PopMatters wrote that Birdy "proves that she can really sing; but [her] appeal may depend on how much enjoy desperate, aching piano ballads, because there are a lot of them here." Duncan Gillespie of NME dismissed the album as "an album of wet-indie covers". Rolling Stone critic Jody Rosen was more critical, panning the album as "the most boring music ever recorded by a teenager" and concluding, "No one so young should have such flawless taste in Quality Indie Rock, or sound this bummed out."

Singles 
"Skinny Love" was released on 30 January 2011 as the first single from the album, which was a cover of a song by American indie folk band Bon Iver. The cover reached a peak of number 17 on the UK Singles Chart.

"Shelter" was released as the second single from the album on 3 June 2011. The song covers a track by English indie pop group The xx and peaked at number 50 in the UK.

"People Help the People" was released as the album's third single on 28 October 2011. The song is a cover of the song by English indie rock band Cherry Ghost and peaked at number 33 in the UK.

"1901" was released in the UK on 9 March 2012 as the album's fourth and final single. It is a cover of the song by French indie rock band Phoenix.

Track listing

Notes
  signifies an additional producer

Personnel
Credits adapted from the liner notes of Birdy.

 Birdy – vocals, piano
 Jim Abbiss – drum machine, production
 Leo Abrahams – effects, guitar
 Ben Baptie – mixing assistance
 Jess Barratt – management
 Rupert Bogarde – engineering
 James Brown – engineering
 Ian Burdge – cello
 Greg Calbi – mastering
 Matt Chamberlain – drums, percussion
 Alessandro Cortini – synthesisers
 Rich Costey – engineering, mixing, noise, production, strange noises, synthesisers
 Paul Craig – management
 Neil Cowley – organ, piano
 Dan Curwin – back cover photograph
 Ian Dowling – engineering
 Lauren Dukoff – photography
 Tom Elmhirst – mixing
 James Ford – drums, guitar, percussion, production
 Wally Gagel – bass
 Alex H. N. Gilbert – additional production, executive production, production, studio photography
 Kirk Hellie – guitar
 Gareth Henderson – engineering
 Chris Kasych – assistant engineering
 Alex MacNaghten – bass
 Stephen Webster Mair – double bass
 Jamie Muhoberac – keyboards, piano, synthesisers
 Audrey Riley – string arrangements, string conducting
 Lucy Shaw – cello
 Christian Tattersfield – executive production
 Christopher Tombling – orchestra leader
 Paul 'P-Dub' Walton – additional production, engineering, mixing
 Richard Woodcraft – engineering

Charts

Weekly charts

Year-end charts

Decade-end charts

Certifications

Release history

References

External links
 
 

2011 debut albums
Albums produced by James Ford (musician)
Albums produced by Jim Abbiss
Albums recorded at RAK Studios
Atlantic Records albums
Birdy (singer) albums
Covers albums
Warner Records albums